Jan van Nijlen (10 November 1884 – 14 August 1965) was a Belgian writer and poet. He was born at Antwerp and died at Uccle.

Bibliography
 Verzen (1906)
 Het licht (1909)
 Naar 't geluk (1911)
 Negen verzen (1914)
 Uren met Montaigne (1916)
 Francis Jammes (1918)
 Charles Péguy (1919)
 Het aangezicht der aarde (1923)
 De lokstem en andere gedichten (1924)
 Zeven gedichten (1925)
 De vogel Phoenix (1928)
 Geheimschrift (1934)
 Gedichten 1904-1938 (1938)
 Het oude kind (1938)
 De dauwtrapper (1947)
 Herinneringen aan E. du Perron (1955)
 Te laat voor deze wereld (1957)
 Druilende burgerij (1982)

See also

 Flemish literature

Sources
 Jan van Nijlen
 Jan Greshoff, Jan van Nijlen 1884–10 November - 1934 In: Forum. Jaargang 3 (1934)
 Stefan Van den Bossche, De wereld is zoo schoon waarvan wij droomen. Jan Van Nijlen, biografie, Lannoo, Tielt

1884 births
1965 deaths
Flemish poets
Constantijn Huygens Prize winners
Writers from Antwerp
20th-century Belgian poets